Andrei Pavlovich Tsygankov (born April 23, 1964) is a Russian-born academic and author in the fields of international relations at San Francisco State University.

Early life and education
Tsygankov received his Candidate of Sciences degree at Moscow State University in 1991 and after emigration a PhD from University of Southern California in 2000.

Career
As of 2017, he has a professor at San Francisco State University in California, where he teaches comparative Russian, and international politics in the Political Science and International Relations departments. 

He has been a contributor at the Pro-Russian Valdai Discussion Club.

Selected publications 
Pathways after Empire (2001)
New Directions in Russian International Studies (2004)
Whose World Order? (2004)
Russia’s Foreign Policy (2006)
Russophobia: Anti-Russian Lobby and American Foreign Policy (2009)
Russia and the West from Alexander to Putin (2012)
Russia's Foreign Policy: Change and Continuity in National Identity (2013) 5th edition (2019)
 Routledge Handbook of Russian Foreign Policy (2018) Chapter 3: doi/10.4324/9781315536934-4

References

External links 
 Home page at San Francisco State University

Living people
University of Southern California alumni
Moscow State University alumni
San Francisco State University faculty
Russian academics
Russian political scientists
Russian expatriates in the United States
1964 births